Michael Keck (born 8 February 1969) is a German badminton player. Keck clinched nine titles at the National Championships, won the first time in 1990. He was the bronze medallists at the 1996 European Championships, winning the mixed doubles event at the World Grand Prix tournament in 1997 Swedish Open. Keck has collected 65 caps for Germany and competed at the 1996 and 2000 Summer Olympics. His brother Markus Keck also a former German professional badminton player.

Achievements

European Championships 
Mixed doubles

IBF World Grand Prix
The World Badminton Grand Prix sanctioned by International Badminton Federation (IBF) since 1983.

Mixed doubles

IBF International
Men's doubles

Mixed doubles

References

External links
 
 

1969 births
Living people
Sportspeople from Fürth
German male badminton players
Olympic badminton players of Germany
Badminton players at the 2000 Summer Olympics
Badminton players at the 1996 Summer Olympics